The 1958 Tangerine Bowl may refer to:

 1958 Tangerine Bowl (January), January 1, 1958, game between the East Texas State Lions and the Southern Miss Golden Eagles.
 1958 Tangerine Bowl (December), December 27, 1958, game between the East Texas State Lions and the Missouri Valley Vikings. Most notable because the Buffalo Bulls unanimously voted to decline a bid to the game (eventually filled by Missouri Valley) when they were notified that the team's two black players would not be allowed to play in the game.